Shashadhar Acharya (born 1961) is a Chhau dance exponent from Saraikela, Jharkhand, India. In 2020, he received the Padma Shri honour from the Government of India for his contribution in the field of Arts.

Life 
Acharya is a fifth-generation dancer from his family. He learned Chhau from his father, Lingaraj Acharya, and then from Natshekhar Bana Bihari Pattnaik, Vikram Karmakar, Kedarnath Sahu, and Sudhendranath Singhdeo. In the early 1990s, he left Saraikela to work at the Gurukul Dance Academy and then at the Prithvi Theatre in Mumbai. He is a faculty member at the Film and Television Institute of India (FTII), Pune and at the National School of Drama, New Delhi. He teaches at the New Delhi-based Triveni Kala Sangam. In 2020, he received the Padma Shri honour for his contribution in the field of Arts.

References 

Recipients of the Padma Shri in arts
People from Seraikela Kharsawan district
Indian male dancers
Dancers from Jharkhand
Living people
1961 births
Recipients of the Sangeet Natak Akademi Award
Chhau exponents